is a Japanese voice actress who was born in Tokyo. She is employed by 81 Produce. She formerly went by the name .

When her father Yojiro Terada and her mother divorced in 2014, Haruhi changed her surname to her mother's maiden name.

Filmography

Anime television
1998
Beast Wars II: Super Life-Form Transformers - Navichan
Ojarumaru - Arisa, Hifumi, Hoshino's Mama (third voice), Kaminariakane, Kintarou's Mama, Komachi Mama, Ojarumaru's Mother, Ushiko
Super Express Hikarian - Anna Michi, Dojiras (second voice), Fuji, Hitachi Green, Thunderbird, Tsubasa (second voice)

1999
Digimon Adventure - Pumpkinmon
Elf-ban Kakyūsei - Ai's Mother
Great Teacher Onizuka - Momoi
Kindaichi Case Files - Shigure Asagi (Ep. 101)

2000
Hamtaro - Daisy, Flora
One Piece - Pepper
Kindaichi Case Files - Yuko Sakamoto
Gensomaden Saiyuki - Qiuhua (Ep. 19)
Yu-Gi-Oh! Duel Monsters - Mai Kujaku

2001
Digimon Tamers - Ai
Shiawase Sou no Okojo-san - Narrator
Soreike! Anpanman - Bikubiku-chan
Fruits Basket - Kana Sohma, Kisa's Mother
The Prince of Tennis - Yūki Akutsu

2002
One Piece - Dip
Tokyo Underground - Ruri Sarasa
Digimon Frontier - Calmaramon, Ranamon
Full Moon o Sagashite - Sasaki
Bomberman Jetters - Rui, Hiroshi

2003
Ashita no Nadja - Madam Reinhardt
Ikki Tousen - Kaku Bunwa
Galaxy Angel AA - Harry's Wife
Konjiki no Gash Bell!! - Djem, Kazu, Waifu, Yun
Saiyuki Reload - Minto (Ep. 13)

2004
Naruto - Tsunade (young)
Kyo Kara Maoh! - Nina
Legendz: Tale of the Dragon Kings - Chiagall
Monster - Izzy
R.O.D the TV - Haruhi's Manager (Ep. 10)
Samurai 7 - Shika (Eps. 11, 17, 26)
Tenjho Tenge - Emi Isuzu
Zoids: Fuzors - Lillin

2005
Futari wa Pretty Cure Max Heart - Hikaru Kujo, Nonomiya
Amaenaide yo!! - Sakura Sugai
Elemental Gelade - Eve
Fushigiboshi no Futagohime - Camellia, Mrs. Butterfly, Nalro
Glass Mask - Namie Tamura; Ragneid; Sugiko Yamashita
Hell Girl - Ryoko's Mother (Ep. 2)

2006
Wan Wan Celeb Soreyuke! Tetsunoshin - Victora, Kaoruko Inuyama
Amaenaide yo!! Katsu!! - Sakura Sugai
Yume Tsukai - Yūko Aomori (Ep. 3)
Air Gear - Ikki (young)
Yoake Mae yori Ruriiro na: Crescent Love - Haruhi Takamizawa
Fushigiboshi no Futagohime Gyu! - Camellia
Digimon Savers - Piyomon
Shōnen Onmyōji - Tatsuki, Utsugi
Ghost Hunt - Noriko Morishita
Kiba - Morina
Red Garden - Kate's Mother

2007
Gintama - Ofusa (Eps. 51-52)
Tengen Toppa Gurren Lagann - Cybela Coutaud
Deltora Quest - Sharn

2008
A Penguin's Troubles - Matsura
Minami-ke ~Okawari~ - Miss Kumada
Rosario + Vampire - Kasumi Aono
Rosario + Vampire Capu2 - Kasumi Aono

2009
Detective Conan - Kaoru Hayashi
Crayon Shin-chan - Midori Ishizaka (second voice)
Minami-ke: Okaeri - Miss Kumada
Naruto Shippuden - Rin Nohara, Tsunade (young)
Ristorante Paradiso - Olga
Welcome to Irabu's Office - Mrs. Ikeyama (Ep. 5)

2010
A Penguin's Troubles Max - Matsuura

2011
Bakugan Battle Brawlers: Gundalian Invaders - Fabia Sheen
C – Control – The Money and Soul of Possibility - Hanabi's Mother
Cross Fight B-Daman - Kakeru's Mother
A Penguin's Troubles DX? - Matsuura
Mitsudomoe Zōryōchū! - Ms. Kaieda

2012
Detective Conan - Sumika Konno

2013
Fate/kaleid liner Prisma Illya - Sella
Minami-ke: Tadaima - Miss Kumada

2014
Ai Tenchi Muyo! - Ayeka Masaki Jurai
Dragonar Academy - Angela Cornwell
Fate/kaleid liner Prisma Illya 2wei - Sella
Fate/stay night: Unlimited Blade Works - Sella
Future Card Buddyfight - Halberd Dragon, Hanae Jūmonji, Kyōya Gaen, Ryōmi Mikado, Stella Watson, Suzumi Mikadō

2015
Kamisama Hajimemashita @ - Kirihito's Mother (Ep. 4)
Shōnen Hollywood -Holly Stage for 50- - Saori Kazehara
Hibike! Euphonium - Akiko Ōmae
Future Card Buddyfight 100 - Ryōmi Mikado, Stella Watson
Detective Conan - Mitsuru Mamiya

2016
Future Card Buddyfight Triple D - Hanae Jūmonji, Ryōmi Mikado
Fate/kaleid liner Prisma Illya 3rei!! - Sella

2018
 Saiyuki Reload Blast - Rei

2020
 Plunderer - Greengrocer Lady / Avsayette Vremya

Theatrical animation
Digimon Frontier: Island of Lost Digimon  - Ranamon
Gurren Lagann the Movie – The Lights in the Sky Are Stars - Cybela Coutaud
Naruto the Movie 3: Guardians of the Crescent Moon Kingdom - Karenbana
Naruto Shippuden the Movie: The Will of Fire - Rin Nohara

Dubbing

Live-action
24 – Carla Matheson (Tracy Middendorf), Meredith Reed (Jennifer Westfeldt)
The Brothers Grimm – Greta
Buffy the Vampire Slayer – Dawn Summers (Michelle Trachtenberg)
Bully – Claudia (Nathalie Paulding)
The Chef – Beatrice
College Road Trip – Trey Porter
Cooties – Lucy McCormick (Alison Pill)
Date Movie – Betty Jones (Marie Matiko)
Deck the Halls – Ashley Hall
Drop Dead Diva – Stacy Barrett (April Bowlby)
Episodes – Carol Rance (Kathleen Rose Perkins)
The Fast and the Furious – Gimel
Gone Girl – Ellen Abbott (Missi Pyle)
Like Mike – Reg Stevens (Brenda Song)
The Lookout – Luvlee Lemons (Isla Fisher)
Merlin's Apprentice – Brianna (Meghan Ory)
Nikita – Leela Kantaria (Kathleen Munroe)
Prom Night – Donna Keppel (Brittany Snow)
The Reef – Kate (Zoe Naylor)
Rizzoli & Isles – Courtney Brown (Andrea Bogart)
See No Evil – Kira Vanning (Samantha Noble)
Skyline – Candice (Brittany Daniel)
Vacation – Audrey Griswold-Crandall (Leslie Mann)
The Way, Way Back – Joan (Amanda Peet)
Wild Things: Diamonds in the Rough – Jenny Bellamy (Claire Coffee)
Y Tu Mamá También – Cecilia Huerta (María Aura)

Animation
Baby Looney Tunes – Baby Melissa
Invader Zim – Gaz Membrane
Jimmy Neutron: Boy Genius – Britney
Kick Buttowski: Suburban Daredevil – Jackie "Wacky" Wackerman

Video games
The King of Fighters XIV - Angel
Digimon ReArise - NoblePumpkinmon

References

External links

81 Produce

1973 births
Living people
Voice actresses from Tokyo
Japanese voice actresses
81 Produce voice actors
Seijo University alumni